Piletocera infernalis is a moth in the family Crambidae. It was described by George Hampson in 1907. It is found on the Solomon Islands, where it has been recorded from Kulambangra Island.

References

I
Endemic fauna of the Solomon Islands
Moths of the Solomon islands
Moths described in 1907
Taxa named by George Hampson